Shahbazlu (also Romanized as Shahbāzlū) is a village in Angut-e Sharqi Rural District, Anguti District, Germi County, Ardabil Province, Iran. At the 2006 census, its population was 127, in 26 families.

References 

Towns and villages in Germi County